Bursa rhodostoma, common name the Wine-mouth frog shell, is a species of sea snail, a marine gastropod mollusk in the family Bursidae, the frog shells.

Bursa rhodostoma thomae (d’Orbigny, 1847) is a recognized subspecies.

Distribution
This marine species has a wide distribution. It is found in European waters, in the Atlantic Ocean off the Canary Islands, Madeira and the Cape Verdes, in the Caribbean Sea, the Gulf of Mexico and the Lesser Antilles, in the Red Sea, in the Indian Ocean off Aldabra, Chagos, and the Mascarene Basin.

Description 
The maximum recorded shell length of Bursa rhodostoma is 35 mm.

Habitat 
Minimum recorded depth of Bursa rhodostoma is 0 m. Maximum recorded depth is 250 m.

References

 Drivas, J. & M. Jay (1988). Coquillages de La Réunion et de l'île Maurice
 Gofas, S.; Le Renard, J.; Bouchet, P. (2001). Mollusca, in: Costello, M.J. et al. (Ed.) (2001). European register of marine species: a check-list of the marine species in Europe and a bibliography of guides to their identification. Collection Patrimoines Naturels, 50: pp. 180–213 
  Rolán E., 2005. Malacological Fauna From The Cape Verde Archipelago. Part 1, Polyplacophora and Gastropoda. (
  Beu A.G., Bouchet P. & Tröndlé J. (2012) Tonnoidean gastropods of French Polynesia. Molluscan Research 32(2): 61–120

External links
 To Barcode of Life
 To Biodiversity Heritage Library (3 publications)
 To Encyclopedia of Life
 To USNM Invertebrate Zoology Mollusca Collection
 To ITIS
 To World Register of Marine Species

Bursidae
Gastropods described in 1835
Molluscs of the Atlantic Ocean
Molluscs of the Indian Ocean
Molluscs of Macaronesia